Chiiild (pronounced "child") is a Canadian experimental soul artist, led by Yonatan "xSDTRK" Ayal signed to Avant Garden Records and 4th & Broadway (Def Jam Recordings). The Montréal-based artist formed in 2017 and released their debut EP, Synthetic Soul, in 2020.

Musical style and influences
With a creative process rooted in collaborative experimentation, Chiiild's work has been universally described as "genre-bending." Various styles the band has drawn from include soul, R&B, psychedelia, jazz, indie, and pop. The band have dubbed this wide-ranging textural sound as “synthetic soul”.

The band has cited D'Angelo, Tame Impala, Pink Floyd, Marvin Gaye, The Notorious B.I.G., Brandy, Wu-Tang Clan, Fleetwood Mac and Moby as influences.

Band members

Current members 
 Yonatan Ayal – producer, lead vocals, bass guitar, sampler

Supporting members 
 Pierre-Luc Rioux – guitar, producer 
 Lauren "LYON" Malyon – violin, keyboards, tambourine, backing vocals 
 Maxime Bellavance – drums

Discography

Studio albums

Extended plays

Singles

As lead artist

As featured artist

Promotional singles

Guest appearances

Tours

Headline Tour 

 Apocalyptic Optimistic Tour (2021)

Opening act 
 The Boundless Tour (2022) (supporting Leon Bridges) 
 A Very Emotional Tour (2019)

Awards and nominations

VEVO

JUNOS Awards

Prism Prize

We The Beat Awards

References

External links 
 Official Website
 Chiiild on Instagram
 

Musical collectives
Canadian soul music groups
Canadian experimental musical groups
Canadian contemporary R&B musical groups
Island Records artists
Musical groups from Montreal
English-language musical groups from Quebec
Musical groups established in 2017
2017 establishments in Quebec